Reel Cinemas Ltd is a chain of multiplex cinemas based in the United Kingdom.

History

The first cinema in the chain was the Curzon Cinema in Loughborough, which was established in 2001. Cinemas in other cities and towns were then added to the newly formed Curzon Leisure Group over the next few years. In 2005, the chain was renamed Reel Cinemas Ltd.

In March 2020, all UK cinemas closed indefinitely due to a national lockdown in response to the ongoing COVID-19 pandemic.

Locations

Reel Cinemas currently have 15 cinema complexes throughout the United Kingdom. 1 is under construction.

Planned locations
Planned Reel Cinemas include:
 Farnham (Spring 2023)
 Burnley (New venue at Curzon Street to replace current cinema - Summer 2023)
 Bishop Auckland (Autumn 2023)
 Ashington (Winter 2023)
 Kirkby (On hold)

Former locations
Former Reel Cinemas include:
 Wellington
 York - Odeon Cinema
 Grantham
 Plymouth

In addition, the following Reel Cinemas were sold to Odeon Cinemas in 2011:
 Andover
 Crewe
 Loughborough
 Newark

The following were planned new sites, but were also acquired by Odeon Cinemas:
 Llanelli
 Swadlincote
 West Bromwich

Gallery

Notes

References

Cinema chains in the United Kingdom